Matthias Grunsky (born in Vienna, Austria) is an Austrian cinematographer.

His career started as camera assistant on movies in Austria and Germany, where he has learnt from cinematographers as Lee Daniel on Richard Linklaters Before Sunrise (1995) or Helmut Pirnat on Franz Antel's "Der Bockerer II – Österreich ist frei" (1996). He then absolved the 2 year cinematography program at the American Film Institute in Los Angeles.

His first feature length movie as cinematographer was Funny Ha Ha (2002) for director Andrew Bujalski, with whom he continued to work on his following films.

Especially with Bujalksi he sometimes works with unconventional cameras. They have used black and white video cameras with video camera tubes on the movie Computer Chess (film), for which Grunsky was nominated for Best Cinematography at the Independent Spirit Awards 2014. On the movie "There There"(2022), which was shot remotely under Covid restrictions, Bujalski and Grunsky employed iPhone cameras.

Grunsky is a member of the German Society of Cinematographers, BVK. 
He won Best Cinematography at the Midwest Independent Film Festival 2019 for the musical "Saints Rest".

Grunsky is working as a cinematographer internationally and on US independent films.

Filmography

References

External links

Matthias Grunsky's website
Filmmaker Magazine: Matthias Grunsky about shooting RESULTS
New York Times:  In THERE THERE the Actors in the Room Are Far Far From Each Other

Living people
Austrian cinematographers
Year of birth missing (living people)